Tweed Heads West is a suburb of Tweed Heads, located on the Tweed River in north-eastern New South Wales, Australia, in Tweed Shire along the Queensland and New South Wales border.

History 
Tweed Heads West is situated in the Bundjalung traditional Aboriginal country.

Amenities

Boyd Family Park is situated on Piggabeen Road, adjacent to Cobaki Creek, with barbecue facility, drinking fountain, picnic setting and shelter.

Demographics

The median age of the Tweed Heads West population was 48 years, 11 years above the national median of 37.

74.4% of people living in Tweed Heads West were born in Australia. The other top responses for country of birth were England 7.6%, New Zealand 3.5%, Scotland 1%, Germany 0.7%, Philippines 0.5%.

91% of people spoke only English at home; the next most common languages were 0.4% Tagalog, 0.4% German, 0.3% French, 0.3% Thai, 0.2% Spanish.

References 

Suburbs of Tweed Heads, New South Wales